The Embassy of Serbia in London is the diplomatic mission of Serbia in the United Kingdom. The building is part of a single group of Grade I listed buildings at 25—36 Belgrave Square.

Gallery

See also
List of Ambassadors from Serbia
Foreign relations of Serbia

References

External links 

 Official site 

London
Serbia
Serbia–United Kingdom relations
Belgravia
Grade I listed buildings in the City of Westminster